Zephyrarchaea vichickmani, the Central Highlands assassin spider, is a spider in the family Archaeidae. The species was first described by Michael G. Rix and Mark Harvey in 2012. It is endemic to Victoria, Australia.

Taxonomy 
The species' specific name is a patronym to honour Prof. Victor Hickman for his contributions to arachnology.

Distribution and habitat 
The spider is known to inhabit only temperate Nothofagus rainforest habitats in the Victorian Central Highlands, in leaf litter.

Conservation 
The species has a limited distribution, however, the abundance of protected habitat around its known range means that it probably does not require immediate conservation efforts.

References 

Spiders described in 2012
Archaeidae